Jean Cherry Drummond of Megginch, 16th Baroness Strange (London, 17 December 1928 – Megginch Castle, 11 March 2005) was a cross bench hereditary peer in the House of Lords.  She also wrote romantic novels and historical works.

Personal life
Strange was educated at Oxenfoord Castle boarding school near Edinburgh, at St Andrews University (where she read English and history) and at Cambridge University.  She married Humphrey Evans, MC, a captain in the Mountain Artillery, in 1952. They both assumed the surname Drummond of Megginch when they moved to Megginch Castle. The couple had three sons and three daughters:

 Adam Humphrey Drummond, 17th Baron Strange (b. 1953)
 Hon Charlotte Cherry Drummond (b. 1955)
 Hon Humphrey John Jardine Drummond (b. 1961)
 Hon Amelie Margaret Mary Drummond (b. 1963) 
 married in 1990 with Philippe de MacMahon, 4th Duc de Magenta
 Hon John Humphrey Hugo Drummond (b. 1966)
 Hon Catherine Star Violetta Drummond (b. 1967)

In April 2006 it emerged that Lady Strange had changed her will on her deathbed, leaving her entire estate to her youngest daughter Catherine, cutting out her other five children.

The actress Geraldine Somerville is her niece.

Title
Although the family home is the 17th century Megginch Castle in Perthshire, Scotland, the family title, Baron Strange, is in the English peerage. Her father, John Drummond, 15th Baron Strange, had spent many years attempting to terminate an abeyance that arose on the death of the Duke of Atholl in 1957; he was confirmed in the title in 1965. The title went into abeyance once again on his death in 1982, but it was terminated in Cherry's favour in 1986, and she made her maiden speech on 4 March 1987.  Upon the Baroness's death the title was inherited by her eldest son, Adam.

Politics and public life
She held traditional conservative views, but resigned the Conservative Party whip in December 1998 when William Hague dismissed Lord Cranborne for negotiating with Tony Blair on reform of the House of Lords. Following reforms which reduced the number of hereditary peers who were entitled to sit in the House of Lords, her 1999 manifesto to be elected to occupy one of the remaining seats (limited to 75 words) was "I bring flowers every week to this House from my castle in Perthshire." She was elected to fill a cross bench seat.

She was President of the War Widows Association of Great Britain from 1990.

Writing
Strange wrote several romantic novels under the pen name "Cherry Evans", including Love From Belinda (1960), Lalage in Love (1962), Creatures Great and Small (1968) and Love Is For Ever (1988). As Cherry Drummond, she also wrote The Remarkable Life of Victoria Drummond - Marine Engineer, a biography of an intrepid aunt, Victoria Drummond, a goddaughter of Queen Victoria who was an engineer for 40 years from 1922, including with the Blue Funnel Line.

References

Obituary from The Times
Obituary from The Guardian
Obituary from The Courier (Dundee)

Strange, Jean Drummond, 16th Baroness
Strange, Jean Drummond, 16th Baroness
Strange, Jean Drummond, 16th Baroness
Strange, Jean Drummond, 16th Baroness
Strange, Jean Drummond, 16th Baroness
Hereditary women peers
Conservative Party (UK) hereditary peers
20th-century Scottish novelists
20th-century biographers
Crossbench hereditary peers
20th-century British women politicians
Barons Strange
20th-century English nobility
Hereditary peers elected under the House of Lords Act 1999